The Battle of Artaza (Acción de Artaza) was a battle that occurred on 20–22 April 1835 during the First Carlist War.  Jerónimo Valdés, at the time Minister of War, arrived at the area known as Las Amescoas with 22,000 men with the intention of definitively destroying the Carlist forces.

Zumalacárregui had 5,000 men, but had the advantage of knowing the terrain and practicing guerrilla tactics.

Valdes’ troops maneuvered up the mountains in the area.  The Carlists, meanwhile, were hidden in the foliage, and were able to harass the Liberal troops day and night until the Liberals gave way.  The total casualties were 700 men.

References 

1835 in Europe
Conflicts in 1835
April 1835 events

Battles of the First Carlist War
Battles in Navarre